Lucie Svrčinová (born 27 November 1974) is a former synchronized swimmer from Czechoslovakia.

References 

1974 births
Living people
Czech synchronized swimmers
Olympic synchronized swimmers of Czechoslovakia
Synchronized swimmers at the 1992 Summer Olympics
Sportspeople from Brno